The 28th Moscow International Film Festival was held from 23 June to 2 July 2006. The Golden George was awarded to the Swedish film About Sara directed by Othman Karim.

Jury
 Andrzej Żuławski (Poland – Head of the Jury)
 Alexei Uchitel (Russia)
 Rémy Girard (Canada)
 Pierre-Henri Deleau (France)
 Julie Christie (United Kingdom)

Films in competition
The following films were selected for the main competition:

Awards
 Golden George: About Sara by Othman Karim
 Special Jury Prize: Silver George: Driving Lessons by Jeremy Brock
 Silver George:
 Best Director: Bertrand Blier for How Much Do You Love Me?
 Best Actor: Jens Harzer for Running on Empty
 Best Actress: Julie Walters for Driving Lessons
 Silver George for the best film of the Perspective competition: Chasma by Yolkin Tuychiev
 Lifetime Achievement Award: Chen Kaige
 Stanislavsky Award: Gérard Depardieu

References

External links
Moscow International Film Festival: 2006 at Internet Movie Database

2006
2006 film festivals
2006 festivals in Europe
Mos
2006 in Moscow
June 2006 events in Russia
July 2006 events in Russia